Eric Bransby Williams (18 March 1900 – 22 June 1994) was a British actor. 

In 1923 he toured the United Kingdom as the Priest in a production of Hamlet with his father Bransby Williams in the title role.

Selected filmography
 His Grace Gives Notice (1924)
 The Sins Ye Do (1924)
 The Presumption of Stanley Hay, MP (1925)
The Gold Cure (1925)
 Confessions (1925)
 The Secret Kingdom (1925)
 The Wonderful Wooing (1925)
 Pearl of the South Seas (1926)
 Easy Virtue (1928)
 Troublesome Wives (1928)
 The Hellcat (1928)
 Little Miss London (1929)
 When Knights Were Bold (1929)
 The Wonderful Story (1932)

References

External links
 

1900 births
1994 deaths
English male film actors
Male actors from London
20th-century English male actors